Eugene Lloyd Trosch (June 7, 1945 – September 7, 2010) was an American collegiate and Professional Football defensive lineman. He played collegiately for the University of Miami and professionally in the American Football League.  Trosch was on the Kansas City Chiefs' roster for two seasons in 1967 and 1969 but according to records, did not play in 27 games.   Trosch attended Madonna High School in Weirton, West Virginia.

Trosch was on the 1969 Chiefs' team that won the fourth and final AFL-NFL World Championship game.

See also
Other American Football League players

References

1945 births
2010 deaths
Sportspeople from Steubenville, Ohio
People from Weirton, West Virginia
Players of American football from West Virginia
American football defensive ends
Miami Hurricanes football players
Kansas City Chiefs players
American Football League players